Thathanur (West) is a village in the Udayarpalayam taluk of Ariyalur district, Tamil Nadu, India.

Demographics 

As per the 2001 census, Thathanur (West) had a total population of 4057 with 2002 males and 2055 females.

References 

Villages in Ariyalur district